Mining in Argentina includes primary aluminum, lead, copper, zinc, silver, and gold. In 2019, Argentina was the 4th largest world producer of lithium, the 9th largest world producer of silver, the 17th largest world producer of gold and the 7th largest world producer of boron.

The mining industry in Argentina is overseen by the Mining Department of the Ministry of Planning and Public Investment.

Mines
Manantial Espejo mine (Silver)
Navidad mine (Silver)
Pirquitas mine (Silver)
Salar de Olaroz mine (Lithium)
Salinas Grandes mine (Lithium)

References